Luma Grothe (born 1993/94) is a Brazilian model.

Biography
Grothe was born in Joinville, Brazil. She is of German, Japanese and African descent.

Career
Luma Grothe started modeling in London, England, where she learned English. Grothe appears in campaigns for L'Oréal, Paco Rabanne. She has walked for Vivienne Westwood, Burberry, Versace and Etam. She made her Victoria's Secret Fashion Show debut in 2016.

References

External links

1990s births
Living people
People from Joinville
Brazilian people of German descent
Brazilian people of Japanese descent
Brazilian models of German descent
Brazilian emigrants to the United States
Brazilian female models
Afro-Brazilian women
Afro-Brazilian female models
Women Management models
The Society Management models